Strange Weirdos: Music from and Inspired by the Film Knocked Up is the official soundtrack album to the 2007 Judd Apatow film Knocked Up, and the eighteenth studio album by American singer-songwriter Loudon Wainwright III, released on May 22, 2007 on Concord Records. The album was co-produced by Joe Henry and Wainwright. Guests featured on the album include multi-instrumentalist Greg Leisz, Van Dyke Parks, bassist David Pilch, Richard Thompson and Patrick Warren.

In 2007 Strange Weirdos reached peak positions of number 32 on Billboard Top Heatseekers chart and number 22 on the Top Soundtracks chart. The album re-entered the Top Soundtracks chart in 2009, reaching a peak position of number 15.

Development
Strange Weirdos served as the soundtrack to Judd Apatow's 2007 film Knocked Up and a studio album for Wainwright, who played a gynecologist in the film.

Critical reception

Track listing 
All songs written by Wainwright unless noted otherwise.

 "Grey in L.A." – 3:15
 "You Can't Fail Me Now" (Joe Henry, Wainwright) – 3:45
 "Daughter" (Peter Blegvad) – 3:33
 "Ypsilanti" (Henry) – 1:52
 "So Much to Do" (Henry, Wainwright) – 3:26
 "Valley Morning" – 3:44
 "X or Y" – 2:54
 "Final Frontier" – 3:47
 "Feel So Good" (Mose Allison) – 2:03
 "Lullaby" – 3:12
 "Naomi" (Henry) – 4:04
 "Doin' the Math" – 5:32
 "Strange Weirdos" – 4:07
 "Passion Play" – 2:54

Track listing adapted from Allmusic.

Personnel

Musicians
 Jay Bellerose – drums, percussion
 Jebin Bruni – organ (7), piano (13)
 Daphne Chen – second violin of The Section Quartet (2, 8, 13)
 Richard Dodd – cello of The Section Quartet (2, 8, 13)
 Eric Gorfain – first violin of The Section Quartet (2, 8, 13)
 Portia Griffin – backing vocals (7, 12)
 Niki Haris – backing vocals (7, 12)
 Joe Henry – acoustic guitar (4,11), record producer
 Leah Katz – viola of The Section Quartet (2, 8, 13)
 Greg Leisz – acoustic guitar, electric guitar, lap steel guitar, pedal steel guitar, Weissenborn steel guitar, mandolin, mandola, 
 Jean McClain – backing vocals (7, 12)
 Van Dyke Parks – accordion (1, 3, 14), piano (5)
 David Piltch – acoustic bass, electric bass
 Richard Thompson – electric guitar (1, 8, 10)
 Loudon Wainwright III – vocals, guitars, ukulele, record producer
 Patrick Warren – piano, pump organ, Chamberlin, accordion; string arrangements and conductor of The Section Quartet

Production
Judd Apatow – executive producer, liner notes
 John Baldi – A&R
 David Buntz – album director for Universal Pictures
 Ryan Freeland – engineer, mixing
 Harry Garfield – executive in charge of music for Universal Pictures
 S. Husky Höskulds – engineer (3)
 Jonathan Karp – music supervisor
 Gavin Lurssen – mastering
 Kathy Nelson – executive in charge of music for Universal Pictures
 Rob Saslow – A&R
 Anabel Sinn – design
 Michael Wilson – photography

Charts
In 2007 Strange Weirdos reached peak positions of number 32 on Billboard Top Heatseekers chart and number 22 on the Top Soundtracks chart. The album reached number 15 on the Top Soundtracks chart in 2009.

References

External links

 Strange Weirdos at Concord Music Group
 Strange Weirdos at Decca Records
 Strange Weirdos at lw3.com, Wainwright's official site

2007 soundtrack albums
Concord Records albums
Loudon Wainwright III soundtracks
Albums produced by Joe Henry
Romance film soundtracks
Comedy film soundtracks